Alejandro Manuel Cárdenas Robles (born October 4, 1974) is a retired track & field athlete from Mexico. He is married to high jumper athlete Romary Rifka.

Career
After forming part of the Mexican  4 × 100 metres relay in the 1992 Summer Olympics, he opted for the decathlon.

In 1995 he earned a bronze medal in the Pan American Games in the decathlon and another bronze as a member of the 4 × 100 relays.

During 1996, he specialized in the 400 m dashes, in which he participated in the 1996 Summer Olympics, and qualified for the semifinals with a time of 45.33 s.

In 1998 he participated in the Central American and Caribbean Games in the 400 m dash, in which he earned a bronze medal.

Cárdenas also participated in 1999 at the IAAF World Indoor Championships in the 400 m dash, in which he earned a bronze medal. That same year he also participated in the World Championships in Athletics, where he ran a personal record of 44.31 s , which earned him third place.

In his last Pan American Games, he took home third place in the 400m dash.

Cárdenas played an active role in the 2000 Summer Olympics, in the 400 m dash, running 46.14 s in the First Round, and 45.66 in the semifinals, where he did not advance.

Cárdenas participated in the 2004 Summer Olympics, in the 400 m dash, running 45.46 s in the first round, and 45.64 s in the semifinals, in which he did not advance.

In 2005 Cárdenas participated in the World Championships, in Helsinki, Finland, being eliminated in the first round with a time of 46.73 s.

International competitions

Personal bests
200 metres – 20.63 s (1998)
400 metres – 44.31 s (1999)
Decathlon – 7,614 points (1996)

See also
Mexican records in athletics

References

External links

Picture of Alejandro Cárdenas

1974 births
Living people
Mexican male sprinters
Athletes (track and field) at the 1995 Pan American Games
Athletes (track and field) at the 1999 Pan American Games
Athletes (track and field) at the 1992 Summer Olympics
Athletes (track and field) at the 1996 Summer Olympics
Athletes (track and field) at the 2000 Summer Olympics
Athletes (track and field) at the 2004 Summer Olympics
Olympic athletes of Mexico
Sportspeople from Hermosillo
Sportspeople from Sonora
World Athletics Championships medalists
Pan American Games medalists in athletics (track and field)
Pan American Games bronze medalists for Mexico
Central American and Caribbean Games bronze medalists for Mexico
Competitors at the 1998 Central American and Caribbean Games
World Athletics Indoor Championships medalists
Central American and Caribbean Games medalists in athletics
Medalists at the 1995 Pan American Games
Medalists at the 1999 Pan American Games
20th-century Mexican people